Aghmohammad Salagh is an Iranian male beach volleyball player. He competed at the 2012 Asian Beach Games in Haiyang, China. He is the 2011 Asian Champion with his teammate, Parviz Farrokhi.

References

Year of birth missing (living people)
Living people
Iranian men's volleyball players
Iranian beach volleyball players
Men's beach volleyball players
Beach volleyball players at the 2010 Asian Games
Iranian Turkmen people
Asian Games competitors for Iran